The 1st FINA World Championships in Aquatics were held in the Tašmajdan Sports Centre in Belgrade, SR Serbia, Yugoslavia, from 31 August to 9 September 1973.

Medal table

Results

Diving

Men

Women

Swimming

Men

Women

Synchronised swimming 

Women

Water polo
Men

Participating nations
47 nations entered the competition.

External links
 FINA Official Championship Results History – Swimming (50m)
 FINA Official Championship Results History – Diving
 FINA Official Championship Results History – Water polo
 FINA Official Championship Results History – Synchronized swimming
1973 World Championships Results
1st FINA World Championships 1973 - Yugoslavia | FINA Official

 
FINA World Aquatics Championships
FINA World Aquatics Championships
World Aquatics Championships
World Aquatics Championships
World Aquatics Championships
Swimming in Serbia
Swimming competitions in Yugoslavia
Diving competitions in Yugoslavia
World Aquatics Championships
World Aquatics Championships
1970s in Belgrade